Michorowo  is a village in the administrative district of Gmina Sztum, within Sztum County, Pomeranian Voivodeship, in northern Poland.

The village has a population of 90.

References

Michorowo